Megametopon is a genus of moths in the family Geometridae erected by Sergei Alphéraky in 1892.

Species
Megametopon grisolaria (Eversmann, 1848)
Megametopon amphibolaria (Wehrli, 1922)

References

Boarmiini